Šiauliai Free Economic Zone is a special economic zone located in Šiauliai, Lithuania. It has an area of 133 ha, and a 15MW power supply capability. The zone is focused on engineering industries: metal, plastics, textiles and electronics. The FEZ is close to the airport and major roads. Originally established in 1996, it closed later and then re-opened in 2015.

FEZ companies

Dental products manufacturer Medicinos linija UAB, outdoor advertising manufacturer Reklamos diktatorius UAB, a Dutch company Formula Air, producing air filtration systems.

Tax incentives

References

External links 

 Šiauliai Free Economic Zone website

Free economic zones of Lithuania
Economy of Šiauliai
1996 establishments in Lithuania
2011 establishments in Lithuania